Bernie Clayton Papy Jr. (February 14, 1930 – April 29, 1995) was a politician in the American state of Florida. He served in the Florida House of Representatives from 1965 to 1968, representing the 114th district. His father Bernie Papy was a long-serving member of the Florida House of Representatives for Key West. 

Papy Jr introduced legislation calling for a $100 fine to be levied against anyone advertising Key lime pie that is not made with Key limes. The legislation was shot down, however.

See also
Mariano D. Papy

References

1930 births
1995 deaths
Members of the Florida House of Representatives
20th-century American politicians